Misael Ortiz (born 4 November 1978) in Pinar del Rio, is a Cuban sprinter specializing in the 200 metres.

Career

He finished fourth with the Cuban 4 x 100 metres relay team, which consisted of Alfredo García-Baró, Ortiz, Iván García and Luis Alberto Pérez-Rionda, at the 1997 World Championships. On the individual level he won a silver medal at the 1998 Central American and Caribbean Games.

His personal best time over 200 m is 20.83 seconds, achieved in February 1999 in Havana.

He defected to Canada following the 1999 Pan American Games in Winnipeg.

Achievements

External links

References

1978 births
Living people
Cuban male sprinters
Universiade medalists in athletics (track and field)
Goodwill Games medalists in athletics
Central American and Caribbean Games gold medalists for Cuba
Competitors at the 1998 Central American and Caribbean Games
Athletes (track and field) at the 1999 Pan American Games
Universiade silver medalists for Cuba
Central American and Caribbean Games medalists in athletics
Medalists at the 1997 Summer Universiade
Competitors at the 1998 Goodwill Games
Pan American Games competitors for Cuba
20th-century Cuban people
21st-century Cuban people